The Parliament of Northern Ireland was the home rule legislature created under the Government of Ireland Act 1920, which existed from 7 June 1921 to 30 March 1972, when it was suspended. It was subsequently abolished under the Northern Ireland Constitution Act 1973.

The fifth Government or Executive Committee of the Privy Council of Northern Ireland was led by James Chichester-Clark, who was the Prime Minister from 1 May 1969 to 23 March 1971.

Cabinet

References

Ministries of the Parliament of Northern Ireland
1969 establishments in Northern Ireland
1971 disestablishments in Northern Ireland
Ministries of Elizabeth II